The Macau Football Association Development is a Macanese football team which currently competes in the Liga de Elite. The club is run by the Macau Football Association and only fields under-23 players.

In 2018, Development participated in the 2018 Chinese Champions League though by league rules, they were not permitted to gain promotion.

Current squad

See also
 Sports in Macau

Notes

Football clubs in Macau
2005 establishments in Macau